Attila Császár (born 23 April 1984 in Pápa) is a Hungarian football player who currently plays for FC Ajka.

References

External links
HLSZ
Lombard FC Papa Official Website

1984 births
Living people
People from Pápa
Hungarian footballers
Association football defenders
Lombard-Pápa TFC footballers
Integrál-DAC footballers
Mosonmagyaróvári TE 1904 footballers
FC Ajka players
Bajai LSE footballers
BKV Előre SC footballers
Veszprém LC footballers
Nemzeti Bajnokság I players
Sportspeople from Veszprém County